Bathmotropic often refers to modifying the degree of excitability specifically of the heart; in general, it refers to modification of the degree of excitability (threshold of excitation) of musculature in general, including the heart. It especially is used to describe the effects of the cardiac nerves on cardiac excitability. Positive bathmotropic effects increase the response of muscle to stimulation, whereas negative bathmotropic effects decrease the response of muscle to stimulation. In a whole, it is the heart's reaction to catecholamines (norepinephrine, epinephrine, dopamine).   Conditions that decrease bathmotropy (i.e. hypercarbia) cause the heart to be less responsive to catecholaminergic drugs.  A substance that has a bathmotropic effect is known as a bathmotrope.

While bathmotropic, as used herein, has been defined as pertaining to modification of the excitability of the heart, it can also refer to modification of the irritability of heart muscle, and the two terms are frequently used interchangeably.

Etymology

The term "bathmotropic" is derived from the Ancient Greek word βαθμός (bathmós), meaning "step" or "threshold".

History
In 1897 Engelmann introduced four Greek terms to describe key physiological properties of the heart: inotropy, the ability to contract; chronotropy, the ability to initiate an electrical impulse; dromotropy, the ability to conduct an electrical impulse; and bathmotropy, the ability to respond to direct mechanical stimulation. A fifth term, lusitropy, was introduced in 1982 when relaxation was recognized to be an active process, and not simply dissipation of the contractile event. In an article in the American Journal of the Medical Sciences, these five terms were described as the five fundamental properties of the heart.

Physiological explanation
The bathmotropic effect modifies the heart muscle membrane excitability, and thus the ease of generating an action potential. The ease of generating an action potential is related both to the magnitude of the resting potential and to the activation state of membrane sodium channels.

During stage 4 of an action potential, the inside of a cardiac muscle cell rests at −90 mV. As the inner muscle cell potential rises towards −60 mV, electrochemical changes begin to take place in the voltage-gated rapid sodium channels, which permit the rapid influx of sodium ions. When enough sodium channels are opened, so that the rapid influx of sodium ions is greater than the tonic efflux of potassium ions, then the resting potential becomes progressively less negative, more and more sodium channels are opened, and an action potential is generated. The electrical potential at which this occurs is called the threshold potential.

As various drugs and other factors act on the resting potential and bring it closer to the threshold potential, an action potential is more easily and rapidly obtained. Likewise, when the sodium channels are in a state of greater activation, then the influx of sodium ions that allows the membrane to reach threshold potential occurs more readily. In both instances, the excitability of the myocardium is increased.

Drugs, ions and conditions

Increasing bathmotropy 

Hypocalcemia - calcium blocks sodium channels which prevents depolarization, so decreases in calcium allow increased sodium passage and which lowers the threshold for depolarization.
Mild to moderate hyperkalemia - causes a partial depolarization of the resting membrane potential
Norepinephrine and sympathetic stimulation in general - raises the resting membrane potential
Digitalis - Converts the normal Purkinje action potential of heart muscle to the automaticity type, which increases myocardial irritability
Epinephrine - Also known as adrenaline, effects are similar to sympathetic stimulation
Mild hypoxia - causes a partial depolarization of the muscle membrane
Ischaemia - causes a partial depolarization of the muscle membrane

Decreasing bathmotropy 

Hypercalcemia - decreases permeability to sodium, hyperpolarizes membrane.
Propranolol
Quinidine and other Class A Antiarrhythmic agents - block the voltage gated sodium channels
Calcium channel blockers - in general have negative bathmotropic effects
Parasympathetic stimulation - decreases excitability only of atrial muscle cells
Hyponatremia - decreases external sodium concentration
Hypokalemia - hyper polarization of the resting membrane potential
Acetylcholine - same as parasympathetic stimulation
Marked hypoxia - causes a marked depolarization of the resting membrane potential

See also
 Dromotropic
 Inotrope

References 

Electrophysiology
Cardiovascular physiology